Purushottam Darwhekar (1 June 1926 – 21 September 1999) was an Indian writer and producer of Indian classical and semi-classical musical plays and radio and television programs. He is credited with a revival of the Marathi musical theater (sangeet natya) in the 1960s.

Early life in Nagpur

Purushottam Darwhekar studied in Nilcity High School, Nagpur. After B. Sc. B. T., he completed M. A. LL.B. with Gold Medal. He was a teacher at Kurve’s New Model High School, Hadas High School, and at Sule High School in Nagpur. He joined Balvihar (Akashvani radio, Nagpur) and thereafter became Script Writer and then Assistant Producer.

Career in Broadcasting and Drama

Darwhekar was Assistant Producer at Delhi Doordarshan from 1961 to 1963, before moving to Mumbai All India Radio (Akashwani) as Producer. He worked as a member of the Stage Review Committee from 1974 to 1980.

In 1977, he was appointed  Special Executive Magistrate. He was also the President of Films, Drama and Cultural Development Board in the same year. He was made the President of Baroda Marathi Sahitya Mandal. He also served as the President of 58th Drama Conference at Pune and by then he was an honorable personality of Marathi Theatre.

He was appointed as Producer in Mumbai Doordrashan in 1986. By the time he retired, he had produced 700 scripts in Hawamahal, Balvihar, and Doordarshan serials, including serials on Pandit Nehru and the China War. After retirement he returned to Nagpur and was appointed as ‘Producer Emeritus’ in the M.F.A. Department of Nagpur University.

Marathi Theater

Darwhekar’s journey in theatre started when he lived in the Mahal area in Nagpur around 1947-48 timeframe - when he was very young and just out of college. He wrote his first kids’ play, a musical, titled Sampacha Vaar and produced it for the Ganapati Festival celebrations. He visited Morone’s Gaayan Shala (music school) to scout the lead for his first musical. He selected a 12 year old girl, Vimal Fulay, as one of the lead characters. The play was so popular that they performed continuously for 15 days at different venues. The following year, he wrote another musical titled Swargatil Kala Bazaar with the same lead character and it was a huge hit as well. He was called Madhudada by the children. Later everyone called him master. He was brilliant academically and also creatively gifted. He was very versatile and wrote the script, lyrics, music and directed the plays. At times he even stepped into character if someone was absent. A truly amazing personality who balanced his creative activities along with his academic pursuits.

On 14 October 1950, Darwhekar established the drama company Ranjan Kala Mandir and presented his first play ‘Atombomb Va Adkitta’. Ranjan Kala Mandir became an institution, spreading to Nagpur, because of his efforts. Through this institution, he contributed to the progress of Marathi Theatre. As a Director he helped start the careers of many actors.

The Child Plays of Mr. Purushottam Darwhekar:
 Upashi Rakshas
 Kabuli Vala
 Paryancha Mahal
 Morucha Mama
 Naradachi Shendi
 Abra-Ki-Dabra

Darwhekar settled in Mumbai in 1973 and expanded the scope of his drama company. His entry in the Maharashtra State Drama Festival, Chandra Nabhicha Dhalala, bagged his company first prize.

Darwhekar is remembered now for a musical play he wrote, "Katyar Kaljat Ghusali". The play ran during the 1960s, was revived later in 2011, and was optioned for a film. In 2015, the Marathi film "Katyar Kaljat Ghusali" was made by adapting his play.

He was also the director of Vasant Kanetkar's historical play "Ithe Oshalala Mrityu."

References 

1926 births
1999 deaths
Marathi-language writers
Writers from Mumbai
Writers from Nagpur
Indian theatre directors
Indian male dramatists and playwrights
Marathi people
Marathi theatre
20th-century Indian dramatists and playwrights
20th-century Indian composers
20th-century Indian male writers
Musicians from Nagpur
Recipients of the Sangeet Natak Akademi Award